Setaregan Varamin Futsal Club was an Iranian professional futsal club based in Varamin.

Season by season

The table below chronicles the achievements of the Club in various competitions.

Last updated: May 17, 2021

References 

Futsal clubs in Iran
Sport in Varamin
2019 establishments in Iran
Futsal clubs established in 2019
Sports clubs disestablished in 2020